Daniel Hemric (born January 27, 1991) is an American professional stock car racing driver. He competes full-time in the NASCAR Xfinity Series, driving the No. 11 Chevrolet Camaro for Kaulig Racing.

After beginning his career in short track racing, Hemric moved up to the NASCAR Camping World Truck Series and raced full-time in the series in 2015 and 2016 for Brad Keselowski Racing. He ran two full seasons in the NASCAR Xfinity Series for Richard Childress Racing, reaching the Championship Round of the NASCAR playoffs in both years, before competing in the Monster Energy NASCAR Cup Series for the team in 2019. Following one Cup season, he lost his ride with RCR and joined JR Motorsports for a part-time Xfinity schedule. In 2021, Hemric joined Joe Gibbs Racing and won his first career NASCAR race and the Xfinity Series championship.

Racing career

A native of Kannapolis, North Carolina, Hemric began his career at the age of five, competing in go-kart racing at the 1/5-mile Concord Speedway, winning 11 races and a track championship at the North Carolina facility before moving up to Bandolero car five years later. During that time, he started doing his backflip celebration, which was taken from Carl Edwards. At 16, Hemric moved up to Legends cars, and in 2008, he won the track's Pro championship, as well as the first of two back-to-back Legends Pro national championships. In 2009, with nearly 60 wins in just under 80 starts, he maxed out his National Points early on the way to winning his second national Legends Pro championship, in addition to earning the Summer Shootout Series championship on the strength of six races in 10 starts. In 2010, Hemric won the Legends Million at Charlotte Motor Speedway, winning the largest paycheck in Legends car history, $250,000.

Late in the 2010 racing season, Hemric made his debut in the NASCAR Whelen Southern Modified Tour; he would run selected races in that series and in the Whelen Modified Tour over the next three years, while in 2012 he ran a full season in late model cars, winning the Champion Racing Association JEGS/CRA All-Stars Tour championship, scoring eight victories on his way to the title. Hemric won the Summer Shootout Series championship again in 2013, in addition to competing in the Southern Super Series late model championship, driving the No. 98 Ford for Carswell Motorsports. He also competed in the Blizzard Series late model tour, winning the series' 2013 championship.

In October 2013, Hemric made his debut in NASCAR national series competition at Martinsville Speedway, driving the No. 6 Chevrolet for Sharp Gallaher Racing in the Camping World Truck Series. He suffered early issues, finishing 32nd. On November 2, he finished second in the 29th annual All American 400 late model race to Chase Elliott, winning the 2013 Southern Super Series championship by one point over Bubba Pollard. In early November 2013, he finished 13th in his second Truck Series race, at Phoenix International Raceway. Hemric made his third Truck start in 2014 for NTS Motorsports, finishing a solid 12th at Homestead.

In 2015, Hemric announced that he would compete full-time for the first time in the NASCAR Camping World Truck Series with NTS Motorsports. Hemric drove the No. 14 California Clean Power Chevrolet Silverado and competed for the 2015 NASCAR Rookie of the Year title. Hemric earned a best finish of fourth (Dover International Speedway, Bristol Motor Speedway, Canadian Tire Motorsport Park) and ran as high as fifth in the NCWTS Driver Point Standings, ultimately finishing the season seventh in the championship standings.

On November 3, Hemric announced that he would join Brad Keselowski Racing to drive the No. 19 Ford F-150 in 2016. Hemric started the season with an 8th-place finish at Daytona. Hemric later majority of the races with many top 5 finishes but no wins. Hemric would make the Chase after being the highest non-winner points.

On September 17, 2016, it was announced that Hemric would join Richard Childress Racing in 2017. Hemric ran the full Xfinity Series schedule and competed for Rookie of the Year, driving the No. 21 Chevy Camaro.  Hemric made his Xfinity debut at the 2017 PowerShares QQQ 300 at Daytona, which is where he finished 31st after being caught up in an early crash.  He rebounded the next week at Atlanta, finishing 9th for his first career Xfinity top-10 finish.  At Bristol, Hemric won the Dash 4 Cash. At Richmond, he won his first career pole and then scored a then career-best 3rd-place finish. At Mid-Ohio, Hemric would run in the top 5 for most of the day, bringing home an impressive and career-best 2nd-place finish. In the playoffs, Hemric advanced to the Championship Round at Homestead as the lone non-JR Motorsports driver. Despite starting the race strong, he was eventually plagued by battery issues that dropped him 12 laps behind the leader. He finished 34th and 13 laps down, fourth in the points.

In November 2017, Hemric practiced and qualified the No. 27 Monster Energy NASCAR Cup Series car of RCR driver Paul Menard at the AAA Texas 500 weekend, qualifying 21st; Menard was on paternity leave but returned for the race.

Hemric returned to RCR's No. 21 for the 2018 season in addition to a part-time schedule in the Truck Series, driving the No. 20 Chevrolet Silverado for Young's Motorsports. On March 20, 2018, it was announced that Hemric would attempt two races in the 2018 Monster Energy NASCAR Cup Series, the spring Richmond race and the Charlotte Roval race driving the No. 8 RCR Chevrolet. In his Cup debut at the 2018 Toyota Owners 400, he qualified 22nd and finished 32nd, three laps down.

On September 28, 2018, RCR announced that beginning in 2019, Hemric would be the full-time driver of the No. 31 Chevrolet in the Monster Energy NASCAR Cup Series, competing for 2019 Rookie of the Year honors.  The agreement came after a deal to drive Leavine Family Racing's No. 95 car in 2019 fell through. Two days later, he drove another Cup race at the new Charlotte Roval, going up to 2nd at one point, but got caught up in a late-race wreck and finished 23rd.

On December 14, 2018, RCR announced that Hemric would be driving the No. 8 car instead of the No. 31 car for the 2019 season. In his first race in the No. 8 at the 2019 Daytona 500, he drove a gold paint scheme to celebrate RCR's 50th Anniversary.

On August 17, 2019, Hemric said he was "iffy" about his status for 2020, despite having signed a two-year contract with RCR. A month later on September 17, the team announced Hemric would be released after the 2019 season. At the October Kansas race, Hemric scored his first career Busch Pole Award. He finished the season 25th in the points standings. Despite a disappointing debut season, Hemric won the 2019 NASCAR Rookie of the Year honors.

Hemric returned to the Xfinity Series in 2020, joining JR Motorsports' No. 8 car for a 21-race schedule and sharing the car with Dale Earnhardt Jr. and Jeb Burton. He recorded 12 top tens during the year.

Hemric moved to Joe Gibbs Racing's No. 18 Xfinity car for the 2021 season, marking a return to full-time competition. At the end of the Atlanta race, he was involved in a fight with Noah Gragson after a pit road mishap during the race. Neither driver was reprimanded by NASCAR. Despite scoring no wins during the 2021 regular season, Hemric made the Playoffs through his consistency. On September 25, Kaulig Racing announced that Hemric would pilot the No. 11 in 2022, replacing Justin Haley as he moved to Kaulig's No. 31 in the Cup Series full-time.

Thanks to his consistency, Hemric would lock himself into the Championship 4, alongside Austin Cindric, A. J. Allmendinger and Noah Gragson. On November 6, Hemric used a last lap, overtime pass of Cindric at the season finale at Phoenix Raceway to not only win the first race of his NASCAR career, but also the 2021 Xfinity Series title. Hemric's ten runner-up finishes prior to earning his first win tie him with Dale Jarrett for the most in Xfinity Series history.

On November 6, 2022, Hemric filled in for Ty Gibbs in the No. 23 car for 23XI Racing in the 2022 NASCAR Cup Series Championship Race at Phoenix Raceway. Gibbs had to miss the race due to the death of his father Coy Gibbs. Hemric was still at the track after the previous day's Xfinity Series race and was able to be fitted into Gibbs' car seat. This marked Hemric's first race with Toyota in over a year.

Personal life
On July 28, 2015, Hemric announced his engagement to K&N Pro Series East driver Kenzie Ruston. They married on January 7, 2017. He announced in November 2019 that Ruston was expecting their first child. Their daughter was born on May 9, 2020. He announced in August 2022 that Ruston was expecting their second child. Their son was born on December 23, 2022.

On September 4, 2019, Hemric established the Daniel Hemric Be the Change Scholarship with Rowan–Cabarrus Community College. The annual scholarship will grant financial aid to one qualifying student in the field of motorsports, welding, or mechanical engineering.

Motorsports career results

NASCAR
(key) (Bold − Pole position awarded by qualifying time. Italics − Pole position earned by points standings or practice time. * – Most laps led.)

Cup Series

Daytona 500

Xfinity Series

Camping World Truck Series

K&N Pro Series East

K&N Pro Series West

Whelen Modified Tour

Whelen Southern Modified Tour

 Season still in progress
 Ineligible for series points

ARCA Racing Series
(key) (Bold – Pole position awarded by qualifying time. Italics – Pole position earned by points standings or practice time. * – Most laps led.)

References

External links

 
 Official profile at Kaulig Racing
 

Living people
1991 births
People from Kannapolis, North Carolina
Racing drivers from Charlotte, North Carolina
Racing drivers from North Carolina
NASCAR drivers
ARCA Menards Series drivers
Richard Childress Racing drivers
Joe Gibbs Racing drivers
NASCAR Xfinity Series champions
ARCA Midwest Tour drivers
JR Motorsports drivers